Ching-In Chen is a genderqueer Chinese American poet and multi-genre writer.

They graduated from Tufts University, University of California, Riverside, and the University of Wisconsin, Milwaukee.
They are the author of recombinant, The Heart's Traffic, and to make black paper sing. Chen is also the co-editor of the anthologies The Revolution Starts at Home: Confronting Intimate Violence Within Activist Communities and Here Is a Pen: An Anthology of West Coast Kundiman Poets. They are a Callaloo, Kundiman, and Lambda Fellow.

Chen has taught in Sam Houston State University's English department, and currently teaches undergraduate courses in the Culture, Literature, and the Arts and Interdisciplinary Arts departments at the University of Washington Bothell campus. They presently serve as the staff advisor for Clamor, the Bothell campus's literary magazine, alongside Amaranth Borsuk.

Career 
Chen's first book, The Heart's Traffic (2009), is a "novel-in-poems" that employs multiple poetic forms, including the sestina, villanelle, haibun, and pantoum. The book focuses on the experiences of Xiaomei, a young immigrant from China to the United States.

Chen's second book, recombinant (2017), received the 2018 Lambda Literary Award for Transgender Poetry.

Works 
to make black paper sing (speCt! books, 2019). 
recombinant (Kelsey Street Press, 2017). , 
The Heart's Traffic (Arktoi/Red Ren Press, 2009). , 
co-editor
The Revolution Starts at Home: Confronting Intimate Violence Within Activist Communities 2011; Ak Press, 2016, 
Here Is a Pen: An Anthology of West Coast Kundiman Poets  Achiote Press, 2009.

References

Living people
21st-century American poets
American political activists
Lambda Literary Award winners
American LGBT people of Asian descent
American LGBT poets
Year of birth missing (living people)
Transgender academics
People with non-binary gender identities
University of Washington Bothell faculty
University of Washington faculty
21st-century LGBT people
Transgender non-binary people
American transgender writers
American non-binary writers